Viktor Bölcsföldi (born 10 April 1988 in Székesfehérvár) is a Hungarian football player who currently plays for Ferencvárosi TC.

References

 Profile at Fehérvár
 Profile at HLSZ 

1988 births
Living people
Sportspeople from Székesfehérvár
Hungarian footballers
Association football forwards
Ferencvárosi TC footballers
Fehérvár FC players
FC Felcsút players
CF Liberty Oradea players
Nyíregyháza Spartacus FC players
Szigetszentmiklósi TK footballers
Hungarian expatriate footballers
Expatriate footballers in Romania
Hungarian expatriate sportspeople in Romania